Totto Osvold (born 21 June 1941) is a Norwegian radio entertainer.

He was born in Ålesund, and is married to journalist Sissel Benneche Osvold. He was assigned with the Norwegian Broadcasting Corporation from 1965 to 2006, as entertainer, and from 1986 to 1990 as program editor. He is known for his cooperation with  "Stutum" and with humorist Harald Heide-Steen Jr. Sand and Osvold were awarded Spellemannprisen in 1973 for their album Stutum Speaking.

References

1941 births
Living people
People from Ålesund
Norwegian entertainers
NRK people
Spellemannprisen winners